The 1983 Wake Forest Demon Deacons football team was an American football team that represented Wake Forest University during the 1983 NCAA Division I-A football season. In their third season under head coach Al Groh, the Demon Deacons compiled a 4–7 record and finished in a tie for last place in the Atlantic Coast Conference, disregarding ACC-sanctioned Clemson.

Schedule

Clemson was under NCAA probation, and was ineligible for the ACC title. Therefore, this game did not count in the league standings.

Team leaders

References

Wake Forest
Wake Forest Demon Deacons football seasons
Wake Forest Demon Deacons football